Montclair, North Carolina may refer to:
Montclair, Cumberland County, North Carolina
Montclair, Davidson County, North Carolina
Montclair, Fayetteville, North Carolina
Montclair, Onslow County, North Carolina
Montclair, Scotland County, North Carolina
Montclair, Wilson County, North Carolina

See also
Montclair (disambiguation)